Tread softly or tread-softly may refer to:

 Cnidoscolus stimulosus, bull nettle or tread-softly, a perennial herb covered with stinging hairs
 Solanum carolinense, Carolina horsenettle or tread-softly, a perennial herbaceous plant with spines
 Tread Softly (1952 film), a British crime film
 Tread Softly (1965 film), or The Violin Case Murders a German thriller 
 Tread softly (composition), by Nina C. Young, 2020

See also

 Soft Tread Enterprises, an Australian production company
 "Speak softly and carry a big stick", American President Theodore Roosevelt’s foreign policy
 Tread Softly in This Place, a 1972 novel by Brian Cleeve
 "Tread softly because you tread on my dreams", a line from Yeats' poem "Aedh Wishes for the Cloths of Heaven"